Jeumont is a commune in the Nord department in northern France. It lies on the Belgian border and on the river Sambre, adjacent to the Belgian town Erquelinnes. It is part of the agglomeration (unité urbaine) of Maubeuge.

Population

Electrical engineering
The name of Jeumont is associated with several companies making heavy electrical equipment for wind turbines, nuclear reactors and naval propulsion. They have their origins in the Atelier de Construction Electrique du Nord et de l’Est (ACENE), which became part of the Empain group under the name Forges et Ateliers de Construction Electriques de Jeumont (FACEJ) in 1921, merged with Schneider Westinghouse in 1964 and in 1993 Jeumont Industrie became part of the Framatome group. Framatome became Areva, which in 2007 sold the generators and motors division of Jeumont SA to Altawest as Jeumont ELECTRIC. Areva retained the nuclear and wind turbine divisions, which were renamed JSPM.

Heraldry

See also
Decauville railway of the Watissart quarries
Communes of the Nord department

References

Communes of Nord (French department)